Geva Carmel (lit. Carmel Hill) is a moshav in northern Israel. Located near Atlit, it falls under the jurisdiction of Hof HaCarmel Regional Council.

History
Moshav Geva Carmel was established in 1949 by immigrants from Tunisia and Turkey, including Moshe Sardines, who later served as a member of the Knesset for Mapai. The moshav takes its name from the Hellenistic Jewish city of Geva, which according to Josephus was situated in a large plain near Galilee and Mount Carmel.

According to Walid Khalidi, it was built east of the village of al-Sarafand, named for and built on the land of the depopulated Palestinian village of Jaba', about 1/2 km northwest of the  village site.

See also
Nahal Me'arot Nature Reserve

References

Moshavim
Populated places established in 1949
Populated places in Haifa District
1949 establishments in Israel
Tunisian-Jewish culture in Israel
Turkish-Jewish culture in Israel